Police Story 4: First Strike, also known as First Strike or Jackie Chan's First Strike, is a 1996 Hong Kong action comedy film directed and co-written by Stanley Tong, and starring Jackie Chan, Jackson Lou, Annie Wu, Bill Tung, Yuri Petrov, and Nonna Grishayeva. It is the fourth installment of the Police Story series. Chan reprises his role as "Kevin" Chan Ka-Kui (named "Jackie" in international releases), a Hong Kong police officer who works for the CIA to track down and arrest an illegal weapons dealer. Jackie realizes that things are not as simple as they appear and soon finds himself a pawn of an organization posing as Russian intelligence.

The film was shot partially in Hong Kong, Crimea (Ukraine), Moscow (Russia) and Brisbane in Queensland (Australia). Chinatown, Brisbane in Fortitude Valley and Underwater World on the Sunshine Coast were also used. Filming took place from August to November 1995. The film was released in Hong Kong on 10 February 1996. The original Hong Kong version was filmed in four languages: Cantonese, English, Russian, and Ukrainian. To advertise First Strike, Jackie recorded the song 怎麼會 Zenme Hui and also made a music video for it. As is typical with Chan's pictures, the US version does not feature the theme song. The North American version also dubbed all the non-English dialogue in Cantonese, Russian and Ukrainian into English.

Plot
Whilst working for the CIA, Jackie is assigned to follow leads of a nuclear smuggling case. One of the tasks the CIA gives him is simple enough: watch a woman named Natasha while on a plane from Hong Kong to Crimea and record her movements. Jackie arrives in Ukraine and the CIA, partnered with local Security Service, take over the task of following Natasha. However, the CIA operation almost falls apart when the Ukrainian Strike Force arrest Natasha. Luckily for the CIA, Jackie spots Natasha being driven away and he discreetly follows her. 

During the chase in Yalta, Jackie discovers that Natasha is working with an unknown male partner, who actually called in the Strike Force to prevent Natasha from being followed. Natasha and the unknown male are also romantically involved. Jackie decides to follow the unknown male to a remote lodge in the Crimean Mountains, and informs the CIA of his location. The unknown male is apparently meeting with Russian mafia members who are interested in a nuclear bomb that is in his possession. The criminals are on high alert when they spot Jackie and agents of both the Militsiya and the CIA arriving. A gunfight ensues. During the battle, the unknown male is identified as Jackson Tsui, a Chinese-American nuclear scientist with CIA links, suspected of stealing a nuclear warhead. 

Jackie finds a briefcase which contained evidence from Tsui, but as he is chased by mafia forces, Jackie loses the briefcase as he falls into frozen waters, and the mafia takes the briefcase. When he recovers in Russian military hospital, he meets Colonel Gregor Yegorov of the FSB, who explains the situation. Jackie goes with him to Moscow where he discovers he has been assigned to work with Gregor to solve a similar case involving nuclear weapons being smuggled out of Ukraine. His task is to track Tsui, who disappeared after their last encounter. He is smuggled into Brisbane, Australia by a Russian submarine.

In order to find out where Jackson is, Jackie befriends his younger sister Annie, who works at an aquarium doing shark shows. Jackie pretends to be Jackson's "sworn brother". Chan's deception is successful, and he eventually meets Uncle 7, the Tsuis' father and the local Triad boss. Uncle 7 is seriously ill and will be getting surgery soon. While meeting Uncle 7, Jackie reveals the true nature of his visit to both Uncle 7 and Annie and informs them of Jackson's criminal activities. Jackie then meets with Gregor to report his findings. He tells Gregor that if Uncle 7 dies, Jackson will surely show up. Unknown to Jackie, Jackson is hiding at the hospital and has given a nuclear warhead (disguised as a small oxygen tank) to Annie, who hides it at the aquarium. 

While following Annie, Jackie gets held up by Jackson, who claims to have a deal with Gregor. He also reveals to Jackie that Gregor has secretly put audio bugs in several of the objects the FSB gave him. After realizing he has been used by Gregor for nefarious purposes, Jackie decides to return home and write a full report to both of their superiors. Two men are sent to kill him, and he is framed for the murder of Uncle 7. He attempts to clear his name by going to see Annie at the memorial hall, but he is (unsurprisingly) unwelcome, having to fight younger brother Allen Tsui and the family's bodyguards until Jackson arrives to clear Jackie's name. Jackson explains that Gregor caught him on a CIA assignment three years before, and forced him to turn into a triple agent: a CIA agent ostensibly turned by the FSB, but in reality serving Gregor's private criminal schemes. 

Gregor uses the nuclear warheads to secure stakes in oil franchises in the Middle East. Jackson was trying to get money from Gregor for the warhead. Annie, Jackie, and Jackson decide to work together to find Gregor and bring him in. Uncle 7's elaborate Chinatown funeral becomes the scene for a complex shootout between the various parties, injuring Jackson as he's caught in an RPG explosion. Annie and Jackie attempt to retrieve the stolen warhead from the shark pool (so that they can return it to the police), but Gregor and his men follow them, leading to a climactic confrontation underwater. During the fight, Gregor shoots the aquarium tank and shatters the glass, which releases a great white shark into the restaurant area. 

During the confusion, Gregor escapes with the warhead and kidnaps Annie to a getaway boat. Jackie saves the tourists from the shark and then pursues Gregor. While Gregor escapes in the getaway boat, Jackie finds and drives a Mitsubishi FTO display car onto the boat. The car pins Gregor, allowing Jackie to successfully retrieve the warhead and save Annie as armed police close in. Gregor and Jackson are apprehended by the Australian police and turned over to Russian authorities. The case is solved, and Jackie is thanked for his work by the FSB and returns to his work in Hong Kong.

Cast
 Jackie Chan as Jackie / "Kevin" Chan Ka-kui
 Jackson Lou as Jackson Tsui
 Annie Wu as Annie Tsui
 Bill Tung as "Uncle" Bill Wong
 Yuriy Petrov as Col. Gregor Yegorov
 Nonna Grishayeva as Natasha Rekshynskaya
 Terry Woo as Uncle Seven
 Allen Sit as Allen
 Rocky Lai as Golden Dragon Club Member 1
 Chan Wai-to as Golden Dragon Club Member 2
 Chan Man-ching as Golden Dragon Club Member 3
 Tang Chiu-yau as Golden Dragon Club Member 4
 Alex Yip as Golden Dragon Club Member 5
 Brett Arthur as Russian Hit Man 1
 Mark French as Russian Hit Man 2
 Damien Gates as Russian Hit Man 3
 Mark Gilks as Russian Hit Man 4
 Nathan Jones as Russian Hit Man 5 (the tall hitman who beats up and chases Jackie in his hotel room)
 Matthew Walker Kininmonth as Russian Hit Man 6
 John Langmead as Russian Hit Man 7
 Steve Livingstone as Russian Hit Man 8
 Steve Morris as Russian Hit Man 9

Distribution
New Line Cinema re-edited the film, making the following changes: new opening credits sequence with Hong Kong scenery, removal of over 20 minutes of footage, new music composed by J. Peter Robinson and almost all the multi-lingual dialogue (English, Cantonese, Mandarin and Russian) dubbed into English.

All Mei Ah Entertainment releases, the Japanese Warner Home Video DVD and the Towa laserdisc are the only versions to date that contain the film uncut and without the language dubbing. The Mei Ah releases feature English subtitles.

Commercial reception

Box office

First Strike was an enormous box office success in Hong Kong, grossing HK$57,518,795 during its theatrical run. It remains Jackie Chan's highest-grossing film in Hong Kong and the third highest-grossing domestic film in Hong Kong film history.

In China, it grossed  at the box office. In Taiwan, it grossed NT$47,284,460. In Japan, it earned  at the box office. In South Korea, it grossed . In Europe, the film sold 72,272 tickets in Spain and 922,863 in other EU countries.

The film was released on 10 January 1997 in 1,344 North American theatres, grossing US$5,778,933 ($4,299 per screen) in its opening weekend. Its total North American box office gross was $15,318,863. Adjusted for inflation in 2021, the film grossed the equivalent of US$32,401,297 in North America and US$98,816,196 worldwide.

Home media
In the United States, the home video release grossed  in video rental revenue during 1997. It was the seventh highest-grossing New Line rental video that year.

In the United Kingdom, the film was watched by  viewers on television in 2004, making it the year's second most-watched foreign-language film on television (below Crouching Tiger, Hidden Dragon). The original Police Story drew  UK viewers the same year, adding up to a combined  UK viewership for both Police Story films in 2004.

Critical reception
The version of the film released in North American cinemas by New Line was met with an overall positive critical response. Mike LaSalle of the San Francisco Chronicle gave the film an enthusiastic review:

Roger Ebert reviewed the film in January 1997 and rated it three out of four stars in Lancaster New Era newspaper. He noted that "Chan is said to be the world's top action star" outside of the United States, and that what "makes him popular is not just his stunts (he is famous for doing them all himself) but his attitude" and reactions to them. He said "Jackie Chan is an acquired taste" and the film lacks "the polish of big-budget Hollywood extravaganzas" while the dubbed dialogue "sounds like cartoon captions," but that "Chan himself is a graceful and skilled physical actor, immensely likable, and there's a kind of Boy Scout innocence in the action that's refreshing after all the doom-mongering, blood-soaked Hollywood action movies."

Arlington Heights Daily Herald newspaper rated it two-and-a-half out of four stars, calling it a "homage to James Bond, spiced up with elaborate fight pieces choreographed to show off Chan's incredible comic battle style."

It currently has a 57% approval rating on Rotten Tomatoes, with a 6.1/10 average rating from 23 reviewers and 6.8/10 rating from 7 top critics.

Awards and nominations
 1997 Hong Kong Film Awards
 Won: Best Action Choreography (Stanley Tong)
 Nominated: Best Picture
 Nominated: Best Actor (Jackie Chan)
 Nominated: Best New Performer (Annie Wu)
 Nominated: Best Film Editing (Peter Cheung, Yau Chi-wai)
 1996 Golden Horse Film Festival
 Won: Best Action Direction (Stanley Tong)
 1997 MTV Movie Awards
 Nominated: Best Fight

References

External links
 
 
 
 

1996 films
1996 martial arts films
1996 action thriller films
1990s police procedural films
1990s Cantonese-language films
1990s English-language films
Films about nuclear war and weapons
Films directed by Stanley Tong
Films scored by J. Peter Robinson
Films scored by Nathan Wang
Films set in Brisbane
Films set in Hong Kong
Films set in Queensland
Films set in Ukraine
Films set in Siberia
Films shot in Brisbane
Films shot in Crimea
Golden Harvest films
Hong Kong action comedy films
Hong Kong action thriller films
Hong Kong martial arts comedy films
Law enforcement in fiction
Police Story (film series)
Hong Kong sequel films
1990s Hong Kong films
Films about the Federal Security Service
Films shot in Moscow
Films shot in Russia